Nasimi Aghayev is the Azerbaijani ambassador to Germany and the former Consul General of Azerbaijan in Los Angeles. Prior to that, he served at the Embassy of Azerbaijan in Washington, D.C. as a counselor for political and public affairs. He joined Azerbaijan's diplomatic service in 1999 and also served at the country's Embassies in Austria (2000–03) and Germany (2005–08), as well as in the Ministry of Foreign Affairs in Baku.

Aghayev holds a Master of European Law (LL.M.) degree from the Europa-Institut of the Saarland University, Germany, and B.A. and M.A. degrees in International Relations from the Baku State University, Azerbaijan. He was also trained at the Diplomatic Academy of Vienna in Austria.

He has served as the editor-in-chief of the Caucasian Review of International Affairs and wrote a book on Humanitarian Intervention and International Law: NATO operation in Kosovo, published in German in 2007. In addition to his native Azerbaijani language, he also knows English, French, German, Russian, Spanish, and Turkish.

LA County Supervisors controversy
On 29 August 2022, Aghayev made a tweet sharing a certificate by the Los Angeles County Board of Supervisors honoring him for his 10-year service as Azerbaijan's Consul General and Dean of the Consular Corps. After a massive campaign by Armenian National Committee of America (https://ancawr.org/press-release/los-angeles-county-supervisors-rescind-signatures-from-scroll-honoring-consul-general-of-azerbaijan/),  all four of the LA County Supervisors whose names were on the certificate; Kathryn Barger, Hilda Solis, Janice Hahn, and Holly Mitchell, stated that their signatures had been added to the certificate without their knowledge or permission.

References 

Baku State University alumni
Azerbaijani diplomats
Living people
Year of birth missing (living people)